Nonlabens xiamenensis is a Gram-negative, rod-shaped and non-motile bacterium from the genus of Nonlabens which has been isolated from seawater from the coast of Xiamen Island.

References

Flavobacteria
Bacteria described in 2020